Jakob Immanuel Pyra (1715-1744) was a German poet.

Biography
He was born in Cottbus in the Margraviate of Brandenburg, studied theology at Halle, where he joined Lange's Dichterbund, and lived with Lange in Laublingen. The two poets published Freundschaftliche Lieder (1746), which, with their delight in friendship and their unrhymed verse, foretell Klopstock. Pyra boldly, and rather pedantically, attacked Gottsched in 1736 with Erweis dass die Gottschedianische Sekte den Geschmack verderbe (1743), and his premature death was partly due to the bitterness with which the attack was returned.

Notes

References
  This work in turn cites:
 Wanick, Immanuel Pyra (Leipzig, 1882)

1715 births
1744 deaths
People from Cottbus
People from the Margraviate of Brandenburg
German poets
German male poets
University of Halle alumni